Caeau Afon Gwili is a Site of Special Scientific Interest in Carmarthen, Wales. It is an area of land protected under the Wildlife and Countryside Act 1981 because it contains wildlife or geographical features or landforms of special importance. The name Caeau Afon Gwili means Gwili River Fields.

See also 

 List of SSSIs in Carmarthenshire

References 

Sites of Special Scientific Interest in Carmarthen & Dinefwr